Suomalainen is a Finnish surname. Notable people with the surname include:

 Jaakko Suomalainen (1540–1588), Finnish priest at the Turku Cathedral, translated first Finnish Hymn book and wrote many hymns.
 Aapeli Suomalainen (1866–1932), Finnish politician
 Juho Suomalainen (1868–1941), Finnish politician
 Kari Suomalainen (1920–1999), Finnish cartoonist
 Tuomo Suomalainen (1931–1988), Finnish architect
 Olavi Suomalainen (born 1947), Finnish marathon runner
 Roope Suomalainen (born 1973), Finnish sailor
 Piia Suomalainen (born 1984), Finnish tennis player

Finnish-language surnames